The Commission on Science and Technology for Sustainable Development in the South (COMSATS) is an inter-governmental organization, having a membership of 25 developing countries and one non-state member from three continents, Latin America, Africa and Asia. Twenty two S&T/R&D institutions of developing countries are affiliated with COMSATS as its Network of International S&T Centers of Excellence for Sustainable Development in the South. The organization aims at sustainable socio-economic uplift of the developing countries through appropriate applications of science and technology using the approach of South-South cooperation.

H.E. John Dramani Mahama, the President of Ghana, is the incumbent Chairperson of COMSATS, who assumed this position on 24 July 2012. The current Executive Director of COMSATS is S. M. Junaid Zaidi who succeeded Imtinan Elahi Qureshi  in February 2017.

The Network of COMSATS’ Centres of Excellence is governed by a Coordinating Council (comprising the heads of Network Member Institutions), the Consultative Committee (comprising the national focal points in Member States) and the Technical Advisory Committee (comprising senior scientists and technologists from the North and the South). The Consultative Committee is chaired by the Federal Secretary, Ministry of Science and technology, Government of Pakistan and the Coordinating Council elects its Chairperson from among its members. These positions are currently being held by Fazal Abbas Maken and Ashraf Shalan, President, National Research Centre (NRC), Egypt. The Secretariat of COMSATS is permanently located in Islamabad, Pakistan and is supported by the grants from the Government of Pakistan. It plays a dual role of the Secretariat and Headquarters of the Network of Centres of Excellence.

Objectives 
COMSATS has the following objectives, as outlined in its Statutes:

To sensitize the countries of the South to the centrality of science and technology in the development process, to the adequate allocation  of resources for research and development and to the integration of science and technology in the national and regional development plans;
To support the functioning and activities of the Network of International Science and Technology Centres for Sustainable Development in the South established under this agreement;
To support other major initiatives designed to promote indigenous capacity-building in science and technology for science-led sustainable development and to help mobilize long-term financial support from international donor agencies and from governments / institutions in the North and the South to supplement the financing of international scientific projects in the South;
To provide leadership and support for North-South and South-South cooperative schemes in education, training and research; and
To support the relevant programs and initiatives of major international organizations working for the development and promotion of science and technology in the South.

History 
COMSATS was established following a foundation meeting organized by the Government of Pakistan, held on October 4–5, 1994, at the behest of the world-renowned scientist and Nobel Laureate from Pakistan, Prof. Abdul Salam. The Inter-governmental Agreement to this effect was signed in Islamabad, with support of the Ministry of Science and Technology (MoST), Government of Pakistan, The World Academy of Sciences (TWAS) and the Consortium on Science, Technology and Innovation for the South (COSTIS).

Major Programmes and Projects 
COMSATS programmes and projects relate to the socio-economic needs of its member countries. In this context, the organization focuses on:

Capacity-building through education and training, seminars, symposia, workshops, fellowships and expert-exchange programs;
Research and development through joint projects in scientific fields, like Information and communication technologies, agriculture, environment, biotechnology, medicinal products, materials sciences, etc.
Knowledge dissemination through COMSATS publications, web-sites/web-portals;
Higher education in Science and Technology with the support of COMSATS’ Centres of Excellence and their affiliated institutions in the member countries.

On-Going Projects 
COMSATS University Islamabad (CUI)
COMSATS Internet Services (CIS)
COMSATS Tele-Health Services
Syrian-COMSATS-COMSTECH Information Technology Center (SCCITC), Damascus - Syria
ISESCO-COMSATS Islamic World Science Net (IWSN), Web-portal

International Collaboration 
Keeping in view the common goals of building and promoting indigenous capacities in science and technology for science-led development, COMSATS has signed a number of Memoranda of Understanding (MoU) with various Ministries, International Organizations and Academic Institutions, to effectively conduct developmental initiatives. Also, the organization has close working relations with various development and donor agencies, such as UNESCO, ISESCO, TWAS/TWNSO, COMSTECH, ICGEB, etc.

Membership 
 the following are listed as members of COMSATS:

References

Further reading

External links 
COMSATS official website
COMSATS University Islamabad (CUI) official website
COMSATS Internet Services (CIS) official website
Islamic World Science Net (IWSN) official website

International sustainability organizations
Educational organisations based in Pakistan
Intergovernmental organizations
Scientific organisations based in Pakistan
Environmental organizations established in 1994
Scientific organizations established in 1994
The World Academy of Sciences